The Charles Willetts Jnr Ltd company of Overend Road, Cradley Heath were a lifting tackle manufacturer who built a light car called the New British between 1921 and 1923 when tackle and winch work was slack.

The New British was launched at the 1921 London Motor Show with a choice of engines. There was a cheaper air-cooled version selling for £205, and the more expensive water-cooled version selling for £215. The New British was powered by a 998cc Blackburne V-twin engine, with friction transmission and chain final drive to a differential-less rear axle. The only body style offered was a 2-seater and the only colour blue. Approximately 100 cars were built before production ceased.

References

External links
Contemporary photo

Defunct motor vehicle manufacturers of England
Cars introduced in 1921
Defunct companies based in the West Midlands (county)